Pixote Hunt (or Maurice Hunt) is a French director, artist, and animator. He has been involved in films such as The Black Cauldron, The Rescuers Down Under and Fantasia 2000, and was most prolific in the 1980s and 1990s.

Filmography

As director

 1994: The Pagemaster (as Maurice Hunt)
 1999: Fantasia 2000 (segment "Symphony No. 5")
 2004: [[One by One (2004 film)|One by One]] (video short)
 2005: Hear My Cry (short)

As animator

 1982: Fun with Mr. Future (short) (assistant animator - as Maurice Hunt)
 1985: The Black Cauldron (as Maurice Hunt)

As character designer

 1984: Snorks (TV series)
 1985: Yogi's Treasure Hunt (TV series)
 1986-1987: Foofur (TV series)
 1988: The Completely Mental Misadventures of Ed Grimley (TV series)
 1988: Fantastic Max (TV series)
 1991: Adventures in Odyssey: The Knight Travellers (short)

As writer

 2005: Hear My Cry (short)

As producer

 2005: Hear My Cry (short)

As art director

 1990: The Rescuers Down Under'' (as Maurice Hunt)

References

External links

French animated film directors
French animators
Living people
Year of birth missing (living people)
Walt Disney Animation Studios people